Jan Timman (born 14 December 1951) is a Dutch chess grandmaster who was one of the world's leading chess players from the late 1970s to the early 1990s. At the peak of his career, he was considered to be the best non-Soviet player and was known as "The Best of the West". He has won the Dutch Chess Championship nine times and has been a Candidate for the World Chess Championship several times. He lost the title match of the 1993 FIDE World Championship against Anatoly Karpov.

Early career 
He is the son of mathematics professor Rein Timman and his wife Anneke, who as a schoolgirl was a mathematics student of former world champion Max Euwe. His older brother, Ton (1946–2014), held the chess title of FIDE Master. He was an outstanding prospect in his early teens, and at Jerusalem 1967 played in the World Junior Championship, aged fifteen, finishing third.

Timman received the International Master title in 1971, and in 1974 attained Grandmaster status, making him the Netherlands' third after Max Euwe and Jan Hein Donner. In the same year he won the Dutch Championship for the first time, having finished second in 1972. He was to win it again on many more occasions through 1996. His first notable international success was at Hastings 1973/74, where he shared victory with Tal, Kuzmin, and Szabó. A string of victories quickly followed at Sombor 1974 (with Boris Gulko), Netanya 1975, Reykjavík 1976 (with Fridrik Olafsson), Amsterdam IBM 1978, Nikšić 1978, and Bled/Portorož 1979.

Tournament successes
By 1982 Timman was ranked second in the world, behind only Anatoly Karpov. In the 1980s he won a number of very strong tournaments, including Amsterdam IBM in 1981, Wijk aan Zee in 1981 and 1985, Linares in 1988, the 1989 Euwe Memorial, and the 1989 World Cup tournament in Rotterdam. Other major successes included Las Palmas 1981, Mar del Plata 1982, Bugojno 1984, and Sarajevo 1984. One of his notable later successes was the 2nd Immopar Rapid Tournament in 1991, a weekend event which attracted a huge amount of prize money. In this knock-out format tournament he defeated Gata Kamsky 1½–½, Karpov 2–0, Viswanathan Anand 1½–½, and finally the World Champion Garry Kasparov 1½–½ to win the first prize of approximately 75,000 USD. His performance was equivalent to an Elo rating of 2950.

World Championship Candidate
Timman's world championship career began at the zonal tournaments at Forssa/Helsinki 1972 and Reykjavík 1975. He failed to qualify for the next stage on both occasions. However his win at Amsterdam 1978 took him to his first interzonal tournament at Rio de Janeiro, where he failed to progress further. He finished in the middle of the field at the 1982 Las Palmas Interzonal, but won the Taxco 1985 Interzonal convincingly to qualify for the Candidates Matches for the first time. However, he lost in the first round to Artur Yusupov in 1986. In the next cycle, after winning the 1987 Tilburg Interzonal he defeated Valery Salov, Lajos Portisch, and Jonathan Speelman, but lost in the final to Anatoly Karpov in 1990. He reached the final round once again in 1993, having defeated Robert Hübner, Viktor Korchnoi, and Yusupov, but lost this time to Nigel Short. However, after Short and Garry Kasparov played their World Championship match outside of the auspices of the sport's governing body FIDE, Timman was invited to compete against Karpov for the FIDE version of the world title. He lost the match by 12½ points to 8½.

Olympiad career

Timman represented the Netherlands in 13 Chess Olympiads from 1972 to 2004, playing on the top board on 11 occasions. In 1976 he won the gold medal for the best individual performance on that board.

Later career
Timman continues to play actively. In 2004 he placed equal first in a tournament in Reykjavík and was equal second at Amsterdam. He played in the gold medal-winning Dutch team at the European Team Chess Championships in Gothenburg in 2005, alongside Loek van Wely, Ivan Sokolov, Sergei Tiviakov, and Erik van den Doel. In 2006 he won the Sigeman Tournament in Malmö Sweden and was second in the Howard Staunton Memorial in London.

Writings
Timman is one of the chief editors of the magazine New In Chess. His book The Art of Chess Analysis is widely considered one of the modern classics of chess literature. His Timman's Titans won the 2017 ECF Book of the Year. His other books include Timman's Selected Games (1995), Studies and Games (1996), Fischer, World Champion! (2002), an account of the 1972 World Championship, Power Chess with Pieces: The Ultimate Guide to the Bishops Pair & Strong Knights (2004), Botvinnik's Secret Games (2006), On the Attack: The Art of Attacking Chess According to the Modern Masters (2006), Curaçao 1962: The Battle of Minds That Shook the Chess World (2007), which covers the 1962 Candidates Tournament and The Art of the Endgame (My journeys in the Magical World Endgame Studies) (2011).

Style
Timman likes to challenge opponents directly in the areas of their strengths. Yasser Seirawan describes a game where Timman had an over-the-board inspiration to opt for a complicated game—the kind that Timman knew Seirawan really enjoyed—in spite of having prepared an equalizing variation beforehand. Timman's fearlessness has caused him to lose a lot of games, but also makes him a feared competitor because nobody likes to lose from their favourite positions. Raymond Keene described Timman's playing style as that of "a fighter, in the mould of Emanuel Lasker".

He has always adopted a wide and varied opening repertoire, playing an array of different systems as both White and Black. When he first reached the world class level in the 1970s, this was relatively unusual, with most elite grandmasters deploying a more narrowly focused range of openings, but it is now the norm.

Example game

 
This game, played between Timman and Garry Kasparov in Hilversum on 17 December 1985, is a good example of Timman's style: 
Timman vs. Garry Kasparov, Hilversum 1985; Ruy Lopez, Zaitsev Variation 1.e4 e5 2.Nf3 Nc6 3.Bb5 a6 4.Ba4 Nf6 5.0-0 Be7 6.Re1 b5 7.Bb3 d6 8.c3 0-0 9.h3 Bb7 10.d4 Re8 11.Ng5 Rf8 12.Nf3 Re8 13.Nbd2 Bf8 14.a3 h6 15.Bc2 Nb8 16.b4 Nbd7 17.Bb2 g6 18.c4 exd4 19.cxb5 axb5 20.Nxd4 c6 21.a4 bxa4 22.Bxa4 Qb6 23.Nc2 Qc7 24.Bb3 Ba6 25.Rc1 Bg7 26.Ne3 Bb5 27.Nd5 Nxd5 28.Bxg7 Kxg7 29.exd5 Ne5 30.Ne4 Nd3 31.Qd2 Ra3 32.Nf6 Rxe1+ 33.Rxe1 Kxf6 34.Qc3+ Ne5 35.f4 Ba4 36.fxe5 dxe5 (see diagram; at this point, Timman finds a game-ending combination) 37.d6 Qxd6 38.Qf3+ Ke7 39.Qxf7+ Kd8 40.Rd1 Ra1 41.Qf6+ (Kasparov cannot hang on to his queen)

Personal life
Timman married twice, with a son and a daughter from the first marriage.

References

External links
 

1951 births
Living people
Chess grandmasters
Dutch republicans
Chess Olympiad competitors
Dutch chess players
Dutch chess writers
Dutch non-fiction writers
Sportspeople from Amsterdam